Paula von Hentke, also Paula Hentke-Müller (around 1900 – around 1954) was a German operatic soprano who performed at the Vienna State Opera and the Salzburg Festival.

Life 
Very little is known about Hentke except her engagements in the Wiener Staatsoper from January 1922 until June 1925, during which she sang numerous small roles, but also appeared in some striking roles, for example 23 times as Barbarina in Le nozze di Figaro, 17 times as Lucienne in Die tote Stadt, 14 times as Ida in Die Fledermaus and 9 times as Esmeralda in Die verkaufte Braut. She sang four times the dewman and the sandman in Engelbert Humperdinck's Fairy-tale opera Hänsel und Gretel. She has also performed in operas by d'Albert, Pfitzner, Puccini, Richard Strauss and Richard Wagner. At the Salzburg Festival in 1922 and 1925, she sang Barbarina, in 1926 Ida in the Fledermaus. From 1925, she had an engagement at the opera house Dortmund.

In the 1932/33 season, she was engaged in Teplice. In April 1932 she appeared again as Esmeralda at the Vienna State Opera, in May 1935 she took over the role of Adele at the Fledermaus.

Hentke was also a concert singer, for example she sang in 1922, 1923 and 1927 arias by Bizet and Meyerbeer, Johann Strauß, Handel and Mozart in concerts of the Wiener Symphoniker.

In 1942/43, she appeared several times in the Vienna Schubert Hall with recitals, accompanied on the grand piano by Karl Hudez. She performed works by Beethoven, Schubert, Schumann, Liszt, Brahms among others

She also worked as a singing teacher. In 1954 she received a teaching assignment for opera-dramatic Correpetiteur at the Universität für Musik und darstellende Kunst Wien.

Main roles

References

External links 
 

German operatic sopranos
Place of death missing
Place of birth missing
1954 deaths
20th-century German women  opera singers
Year of birth uncertain